A total of 216 qualifying places are available for fencing events at the 2015 European Games. The qualification will be based on the FIE Official Ranking on 30 November 2014 and the Qualifying Competition 20–21 December 2014.

Qualification timeline

Qualification summary

Qualification

Men's Team Épée

Men's Individual Épée

Men's Team Foil

Men's Individual Foil

Men's Team Sabre

Men's Individual Sabre

Women's Team Épée

Women's Individual Épée

Women's Team Foil

Women's Individual Foil

Women's Team Sabre

Women's Individual Sabre

References

Qualification
European Games
Qualification for the 2015 European Games